Events in the year 2004 in Hong Kong.

Incumbents
 Chief Executive: Tung Chee-hwa

Events

April
 2 April – Playhouse Disney (Hong Kong TV channel) is launched.

August
  13 to 29 August – Hong Kong at the 2004 Summer Olympics

September
 12 September - 2004 Hong Kong legislative election
 17 to 28 September - Hong Kong at the 2004 Summer Paralympics

October
 October - MC Jin, American son of Hong Kong immigrants, a rapper, songwriter, actor and comedian, releases his debut album, The Rest Is History.

December
 21 December - Ma On Shan rail line is opened.

Full date unknown
 Kelly Chen, Hong Kong female celebrity is awarded "The Outstanding Young Persons of the World" by the Junior Chamber International.

Deaths

May
 1 May - Wong Ker-lee, 93, Fujianese Hong Kong businessman and politician. (b. 1910)

June
 11 June - Joyce Symons, 85, Hong Kong educator. (b. 1918)

July
 16 July - John Park, 80, Hong Kong sailor (b. 1924)

November
 24 November - James Wong, 64, Hong Kong lyricist, actor, director, talk show host and author (b. 1941)

See also
 List of Hong Kong films of 2004

References

 
Years of the 21st century in Hong Kong
Hong Kong
Hong Kong